I due gattoni a nove code... e mezza ad Amsterdam (Italian for "The two cats o' nine tails ... and a half in Amsterdam") is a 1972 Italian comedy film written and directed by Osvaldo Civirani (here credited as Richard Kean) starring the comic duo Franco and Ciccio. The title spoofs the Dario Argento's giallo The Cat o' Nine Tails (Il gatto a nove code in Italian).

Plot 

The journalist Ciccio and the photographer Franco are looking for a scoop, as they stumble by chance in the murder of a Dutch diamond dealer of which Franco immortalizes the fateful moment. Thanks to this event the couple get an engagement and a transfer to Amsterdam to investigate the murder.

Cast 

Franco Franchi: Franco 
Ciccio Ingrassia: Ciccio 
Eliìzabeth Turner: Thea
Enzo Andronico: Berger
Luigi Bonos: Bing Bong
Luciano Pigozzi: Killer
Umberto D'Orsi: Policeman
Luca Sportelli : Interpol Agent

References

External links

1972 films
Films directed by Osvaldo Civirani
Films set in Amsterdam
Italian buddy comedy films
1970s buddy comedy films
1972 comedy films
1970s Italian films